The 1977–78 Yorkshire Cup was the seventieth occasion on which the  Yorkshire Cup competition had been held. This year, for the first time for eighteen years (and the last time in the history of the  Yorkshire Cup), a new name appeared on the  trophy, with Castleford winning it by beating Featherstone Rovers in the final by the score of 17-7. The match was played at Headingley, Leeds, now in West Yorkshire. The attendance was 6,318 and receipts were £4,528. It as also Featherstone Rovers's second consecutive Yorkshire Cup final appearances, both of which resulted in a defeat.

Background 
The Rugby Football League's Yorkshire Cup competition was a knock-out competition between (mainly professional) rugby league clubs from  the  county of Yorkshire. The actual area was at times increased to encompass other teams from  outside the  county such as Newcastle, Mansfield, Coventry, and even London (in the form of Acton & Willesden).

The Rugby League season always (until the onset of "Summer Rugby" in 1996) ran from around August-time through to around May-time and this competition always took place early in the season, in the Autumn, with the final taking place in (or just before) December (The only exception to this was when disruption of the fixture list was caused during, and immediately after, the two World Wars)

Competition and results  
This season there were no junior/amateur clubs taking part, no new entrants and no "leavers" and so the total of entries remained the  same at sixteen. This in turn resulted in no byes in the first round.

Round 1 
Involved  8 matches (with no byes) and 16 clubs

Round 2 - Quarter-finals 
Involved 4 matches and 8 clubs

Round 2 - replays  
Involved  1 match and 2 clubs

Round 3 – Semi-finals  
Involved 2 matches and 4 clubs

Final

Teams and scorers 

Scoring - Try = three points - Goal = two points - Drop goal = one point

The road to success

Notes 
1 * Headingley, Leeds, is the home ground of Leeds RLFC with a capacity of 21,000. The record attendance was  40,175 for a league match between Leeds and Bradford Northern on 21 May 1947.

See also 
1977–78 Northern Rugby Football League season
Rugby league county cups

References

External links
Saints Heritage Society
1896–97 Northern Rugby Football Union season at wigan.rlfans.com 
Hull&Proud Fixtures & Results 1896/1897
Widnes Vikings - One team, one passion Season In Review - 1896-97
The Northern Union at warringtonwolves.org

RFL Yorkshire Cup
Yorkshire Cup